Jethro Bithell (29 January 1878 – Paignton, 26 February 1962) was a collier's son, born at Birchall Farm, Hindley, near Wigan. He graduated with first-class honours in Modern Languages from Owens College, Manchester, in 1900. After gaining his M.A. there, he continued his studies in Munich and Copenhagen and then returned to Manchester as Lecturer in German. In 1910 he was appointed Head of the German Department at Birkbeck College, London, where he remained until his retirement in 1938.

Selected publications
 Contemporary German Poetry, 1909
 Contemporary Belgian Poetry, 1911
 Contemporary Belgian Literature, 1911
 Contemporary French Poetry, 1912
 Life and Writings of Maurice Maeterlinck, 1913
 Turandot, Princess of China: A Chinoiserie in Three Acts. (1913) (Translation of libretto for Ferrucio Busoni's opera Turandot by Carlo Gozzi and Karl Vollmöller) 
 Germany: a Companion to German Studies (1932)
 Modern German Literature, 1880–1938 (1939)
 Anthology of German Poetry, 1880–1940 (1941)

References

External links 
Jethro Bithell: A biographical note Wiley online. (First page only without subscription)
Jethro Bithell at the Online Books Page

1878 births
1962 deaths
Academics of Birkbeck, University of London